The 2004–05 New York Knicks season was the 59th season for the team in the National Basketball Association (NBA). During the offseason, the Knicks acquired Jamal Crawford from the Chicago Bulls. Early in the season, the team released Shandon Anderson after he had played one game; Anderson later joined the Miami Heat as a free agent. The Knicks played around .500 with a 16–13 start, but then lost 16 of their next 18 games. Head coach Lenny Wilkens resigned after a 17–22 start, and was replaced by assistant Herb Williams for the remainder of the season. The Knicks then lost nine straight games between March and April, finishing fourth place in the Atlantic Division with a 33–49 record, and failing to qualify for the NBA Playoffs. 

In his first full season with the Knicks, Stephon Marbury led the team with 21.7 points, 8.1 assists and 1.5 steals per game, and Jamal Crawford finished second on the team in scoring, averaging 17.7 points per game. Following the season, Larry Brown was hired as coach, Kurt Thomas was traded to the Phoenix Suns, Tim Thomas was dealt to the Chicago Bulls, and Allan Houston, who played just 20 games due to injury, retired after 12 seasons in the NBA.

NBA Draft

Roster

Regular season

Record vs. opponents

See also
2004–05 NBA season

References

New York Knicks seasons
New York Knicks
New York Knicks
New York Knick
2000s in Manhattan
Madison Square Garden